The following is a list of codes for International Statistical Classification of Diseases and Related Health Problems.

 List of ICD-9 codes 001–139: infectious and parasitic diseases
 List of ICD-9 codes 140–239: neoplasms
 List of ICD-9 codes 240–279: endocrine, nutritional and metabolic diseases, and immunity disorders
 List of ICD-9 codes 280–289: diseases of the blood and blood-forming organs
 List of ICD-9 codes 290–319: mental disorders
 List of ICD-9 codes 320–389: diseases of the nervous system and sense organs
 List of ICD-9 codes 390–459: diseases of the circulatory system
 List of ICD-9 codes 460–519: diseases of the respiratory system
 List of ICD-9 codes 520–579: diseases of the digestive system
 List of ICD-9 codes 580–629: diseases of the genitourinary system
 List of ICD-9 codes 630–679: complications of pregnancy, childbirth, and the puerperium
 List of ICD-9 codes 680–709: diseases of the skin and subcutaneous tissue
 List of ICD-9 codes 710–739: diseases of the musculoskeletal system and connective tissue
 List of ICD-9 codes 740–759: congenital anomalies
 List of ICD-9 codes 760–779: certain conditions originating in the perinatal period
 List of ICD-9 codes 780–799: symptoms, signs, and ill-defined conditions
 List of ICD-9 codes 800–999: injury and poisoning
 List of ICD-9 codes E and V codes: external causes of injury and supplemental classification

See also
 International Statistical Classification of Diseases and Related Health Problems: ICD-9 – provides multiple external links for looking up ICD codes
 MS Access MDB file at United States Department of Health and Human Services in the downloads section at the bottom

References 

International Classification of Diseases
Medical lists